The 2004 Samsung/Radio Shock 500 was the seventh stock car race of the 2004 NASCAR Nextel Cup Series season and the eighth iteration of the event. The race was held on Sunday, April 4, 2004, before a crowd of 216,000 in Fort Worth, Texas at Texas Motor Speedway, a 1.5 miles (2.4 km) permanent tri-oval shaped racetrack. The race took the scheduled 334 laps to complete. At race's end, Elliott Sadler of Robert Yates Racing would win in a photo finish against Kasey Kahne of Evernham Motorsports to win his second career NASCAR Nextel Cup Series win and his first win of the season. Sadler would win by 0.028 seconds over Kahne. To fill out the podium, Jeff Gordon of Hendrick Motorsports would finish third.

Background 

Texas Motor Speedway is a speedway located in the northernmost portion of the U.S. city of Fort Worth, Texas – the portion located in Denton County, Texas. The track measures 1.5 miles (2.4 km) around and is banked 24 degrees in the turns, and is of the oval design, where the front straightaway juts outward slightly. The track layout is similar to Atlanta Motor Speedway and Charlotte Motor Speedway (formerly Lowe's Motor Speedway). The track is owned by Speedway Motorsports, Inc., the same company that owns Atlanta and Charlotte Motor Speedway, as well as the short-track Bristol Motor Speedway.

Entry list 

*Withdrew.

Practice

First practice 
The first practice session would occur on Friday, April 2, at 11:20 AM CST and would last for two hours.

Second practice 
The second practice session would occur on Saturday, April 3, at 9:30 AM CST and would last for 45 minutes.

Third and final practice 
The third and final practice session, sometimes referred to as Happy Hour, would occur on Saturday, April 3, at 11:10 AM CST and would last for 45 minutes.

Qualifying 
Qualifying was held on Friday, April 2, at 3:00 PM CST. Each driver would have two laps to set a fastest time; the fastest of the two would count as their official qualifying lap. Positions 1-38 would be decided on time, while positions 39-43 would be based on provisionals. Four spots are awarded by the use of provisionals based on owner's points. The fifth is awarded to a past champion who has not otherwise qualified for the race. If no past champ needs the provisional, the next team in the owner points will be awarded a provisional.

Andy Belmont, driving for SCORE Motorsports would crash on his first lap. As the team had already run out of provisionals, Belmont failed to qualify.

Four drivers would fail to qualify: Kyle Busch, Morgan Shepherd, Andy Hillenburg, and Andy Belmont.

Full qualifying results

Race results

References 

2004 NASCAR Nextel Cup Series
NASCAR races at Texas Motor Speedway
April 2004 sports events in the United States
2004 in sports in Texas